Pauline Betz defeated Louise Brough in the final, 6–2, 6–4 to win the ladies' singles tennis title at the 1946 Wimbledon Championships. Alice Marble was the defending champion, but was ineligible to compete after turning professional.

Seeds

  Pauline Betz (champion)
  Margaret Osborne (semifinals)
  Louise Brough (final)
  Kay Menzies (quarterfinals)
  Dorothy Bundy (semifinals)
  Jean Bostock (quarterfinals)
  Doris Hart (quarterfinals)
  Simone Lafargue (fourth round)

Draw

Finals

Top half

Section 1

Section 2

Section 3

Section 4

Bottom half

Section 5

Section 6

Section 7

Section 8

References

External links

Women's Singles
Wimbledon Championship by year – Women's singles
Wimbledon Championships
Wimbledon Championships